A marionette is a type of puppet moved by strings.

Marionette may also refer to:

Film
 Marionettes (film), a 1936 Soviet film directed by Yakov Protazanov
 Marionette (1939 film), an Italian film
 Marionette (2017 film), a South Korean film
 Marionette (2020 film), a Dutch–Luxembourgish film, winner of the Golden Calf for Best Production Design

Music
 Marionette (band), a Swedish metal band
 Marionette (EP), by Stellar, 2014
 "Marionette" (song), the title song
 "Marionette", a song by Ayumi Hamasaki from Guilty, 2008
 "Marionette", a song by Soul Asylum from Hang Time, 1988

Other
 The Marionettes (1963), a puppet play by Bahram Beyzai
 Marionette, the former name for Presto, the in-house proprietary 3D animation software created and used by Disney Pixar
 "Marionettes, Inc.", a short story by Ray Bradbury from his collection of short stories, The Illustrated Man
 Marionette (show), a breakdancing performance created and performed by Expression
 "Marionette" (Fringe), an episode of the television series Fringe
 "Marionettes", an episode of the television series The Crown
 Marionette, a fictional character who appears in Marvel Comics as a member of the Micronauts
 Marionette, a character in the Five Nights at Freddy's franchise

See also
 Marinette (disambiguation)